Dampiera hederacea, commonly known as the karri dampiera, is an erect perennial herb in the family Goodeniaceae. The species, which is endemic to the south-west of Western Australia, is a low spreading shrub which reaches 40 cm (16 in) across. It produces blue flowers between August and January in its native range.

References

hederacea
Eudicots of Western Australia
Plants described in 1830
Endemic flora of Western Australia